André Guichaoua is a French sociologist and former expert witness for the International Criminal Tribunal for Rwanda. He has been described by Scott Straus as "a leading scholar of Rwanda and the Habyarimana period".

Works

References

French sociologists
Historians of Rwanda
Living people
Year of birth missing (living people)